"Whiskey Under The Bridge" is a song co-written and recorded by American country music duo Brooks & Dunn.  It was released in September 1995 as the fifth and final single from their album Waitin' on Sundown.  It peaked at number 5 on the Billboard Hot Country Singles & Tracks chart.  The song was written by Kix Brooks, Don Cook and Ronnie Dunn.

Critical reception
Larry Flick, of Billboard magazine reviewed the song favorably saying that Ronnie Dunn "shines on this well written tune" and that his voice "does equal justice to a heartbreaking weeper of a two-steppin' dance number."

Chart positions
"Whiskey Under the Bridge" debuted at number 53 on the U.S. Billboard Hot Country Singles & Tracks for the week of September 23, 1995.

Year-end charts

References

1995 singles
Brooks & Dunn songs
Songs written by Kix Brooks
Songs written by Don Cook
Songs written by Ronnie Dunn
Song recordings produced by Don Cook
Song recordings produced by Scott Hendricks
Arista Nashville singles
1994 songs